The Ministry of Culture is a government ministry office of the Syrian Arab Republic, responsible for cultural affairs in Syria.

History
The ministry was created during the union with Egypt in the name of the Ministry of Culture and National Guidance, and it was officially renamed the Ministry of Culture in 2014 according to Law 31.

The ministry was headed by Dr. Lubanah Mshaweh since August 30, 2020.

Names of the Ministry
Ministry of National Guidance (1958)
Ministry of Culture and National Guidance (1958–1961)
Ministry of National Guidance (1961)
Ministry of Culture and National Guidance (1961–1966)
Ministry of Culture, National Guidance and Tourism (1966–1972)
Ministry of Culture and National Guidance (1972–1980)
Ministry of Culture (1980–)

Organisation
Organisation scheme:
 Directorate of the Minister's Office
 Office of the Assistant Minister
 Counsellors' office
 Press office
 Complaints office
 Financial management
 Informatics department
 Readiness Department
 Administrative Development Directorate
 Legal Affairs Directorate
 Directorate of Adult Education
 Engineering Department
 Directorate of Arab Cultural Centers and Libraries
 Directorate of Revival of Folklore
 Directorate of Theaters and Music
 Festivals Directorate
 Directorate of Conservatories and Ballet
 Directorate of Fine Arts
 Department of Internal Control
 Technical Supervision Directorate
 Directorate of Copyright Protection
 Directorate of Planning, Studies and Statistics
 Directorate of Child Culture
 Directorate of Cultural Relations
 Directorate of Administrative Affairs

Entities affiliated with the Ministry 
 Al-Assad National Library
 General Cinema Corporation
 Damascus Opera House
 Directorate-General of Antiquities and Museums
 Higher Institute of Dramatic Arts
 Higher Institute of Music in Damascus
 Syrian General Organization of Books

Responsibilities

Objectives
The Ministry of Culture works to achieve the following objectives:
Preserving the civilizational and cultural identity, and protecting the archaeological and historical heritage (tangible and intangible).
 Spreading culture locally, Arab and international, and interacting with global cultures.
 Taking care of the creative process, developing it and expanding its horizons.
 Taking care of the educated, and protecting the cultural output.
 Develop legislation, regulations and laws in line with the general visions and objectives of the Ministry.
 Adopting the principle of transparency and ease of access to information to be available for use within the framework of the ministry's objectives, its work plan, and the service of citizens.
 Achieving integration, a unified vision of workflow, eliminating the concept of duplication (in procedures and tasks), reducing wastage of time and effort, and raising the percentage of job performance.
 Achieving integration with the information infrastructure and the comprehensive automation system in the country, and adopting the principle of feedback in order to achieve flexibility and permanent renewal in planning and decision-making.
 Adopting clear standards of performance and description of tasks for all administrative structures at various levels.
 Reducing the centralization of decisions, adopting the principle of planning according to objectives, raising the level of qualification and training of employees in the Ministry, and attracting, developing and training talents.

Tasks 
The Ministry performs the following tasks:
 Disseminating knowledge and culture among the masses, introducing the Arab civilization, spreading its message, and providing all capabilities to interact with major global civilizations.
 Guiding the people in a correct national direction, working on developing their awareness and guiding them to what raises their social level, strengthens their moral spirit, and their sense of responsibility, and motivates them to cooperate, sacrifice and redouble efforts in the service of the nation and humanity.
 Facilitating the means of popular culture, diversifying its methods and expanding its scope, enriching it with modern innovations and benefiting the largest possible number of them.
 Contacting foreign cultural and artistic institutions and benefiting from their activities, and inviting senior men of culture, thought and art in the world to visit the Syrian Arab Republic and give lectures and talks in its various cities.
 Implementation of the provisions of cultural treaties concluded with foreign and Arab governments, within the jurisdiction of the Ministry.
 Organizing exhibitions, festivals, cultural and artistic parties, holding conferences, organizing competitions, setting prizes, encouraging the establishment of various cultural associations, tracking their activities, and helping them to carry out their tasks.
 Reviving the ancient Arab heritage in science, literature, and research in Arabic language sciences, ensuring its safety and making it accommodate modern sciences, arts and inventions.
 Discovering the archaeological and historical heritage of the Syrian Arab Republic, collecting its elements, preserving them and preserving them intact for future generations.
 Creation of archaeological, historical, artistic and folk museums, and assistance in organizing other museums affiliated to the state's ministries, departments and public institutions.
 Encouraging the arts and literature and directing them to what is required in the interest of the state, reviving its activities, securing its future, providing the means of life, work and welfare for its professionals, reviving literature and folk arts, developing and developing them, and collecting information about them.

Ministers
Fathi Radwan (6 March 1958 – 7 October 1958)
Salah al-Din al-Bitar (Central Ministry) (7 October 1958 – 30 December 1959)
Thabet Al-Arees (Central Ministry) (20 September 1960 – 16 August 1961)
Riyad Al-Malki (Northern Territory) (7 October 1958 – 17 March 1960)
Thabet Al-Aris (Northern Territory) (17 March 1960 – 16 August 1961) 
Tharwat Okasha (16 August 1961 – 29 September 1961)
Izzat al- Nass (29 September 1961 – 20 November 1961)
Ahmed Al-Samman (20 November 1961 – 22 December 1961)
Fouad Al-Adel (22 December 1961 – 16 April 1962)
Abdul-Salam Ojeili (16 April 1962 – 20 June 1962)
Omar Shakhashiro (20 June 1962 – 17 September 1962)
Rafik Gabriel Bashour (17 September 1962 – 9 March 1963)
Sami al-Jundi (9 March 1963 – 12 November 1963)
Shibli al-Aysami (12 November 1963 – 14 May 1964)
Asead Muhafil (14 May 1964 – 3 October 1964 )
Suleiman Al-Khash (3 October 1964 – 1 January 1966)
Asad Dargawi (1 January 1966 – 1 March 1966)
Jamil Shya (1 March 1966 – 19 January 1967)
Zuhair Akkad (19 January 1967 – 29 October 1968)
Suhail al-Ghazi (29 October 1968 – 21 November 1970)
Fawzi Kayali (21 November 1970 – 7 August 1976)
Dr. Najah al-Attar (7 August 1976 – 13 March 2000)
Maha Qanout (13 March 2000 – 13 December 2001)
Najwa Qassab Hassan (13 December 2001 – 10 September 2003)
Mahmoud al-Sayyed (10 September 2003 – 21 February 2006)
 Riyad Naasan Agha (21 February 2006 – 3 October 2010)
Riad Ismat (3 October 2010 – 23 June 2012)
 Dr. Lubanah Mshaweh (23 June 2012 – 27 August 2014)
 Issam Khalil (27 August 2014 – 27 July 2016)
 Muhammad al-Ahmad (27 July 2016 – 30 August 2020)
 Dr. Lubanah Mshaweh (30 August 2020 – incumbent)

References

External links

Ministry of Culture

Syria
Culture
Organizations based in Damascus